Caulerpa corynephora is a species of seaweed in the Caulerpaceae family.

It is found along the coast in a large area extending from around the Abrolhos Islands in the Mid West region to the Kimberley region of Western Australia.

References

corynephora
Species described in 1842